Vinícius Vasconcelos Araújo (born 22 February 1993) is a Brazilian professional footballer as a forward for Japanese club FC Machida Zelvia.

Club career

Cruzeiro
Born in João Monlevade, Araújo joined local Cruzeiro's academy in 2007, aged 14. He made his Série A on 6 July 2013, starting in a 1–1 away draw against Portuguesa.

Eight days later, Araújo scored his first professional goals, in a 3–0 home win over Náutico. He finished the campaign with 21 appearances and eight goals (16 in the league, 1118 minutes overall), as the Raposa was crowned champions.

Valencia
On 31 January 2014, La Liga side Valencia CF bought a half of Vinícius Araújo's rights, for €3.5 million.
His debut in La Liga came on 2 March 2014, as he replaced Portu in the 70th minute of a 0–1 away loss to Rayo Vallecano.

On 25 August 2014, Araújo was loaned to Belgian Pro League side Standard Liège, in a season-long deal. Sparingly used, he was loaned back to his first club Cruzeiro on 25 June 2015.

After being rarely used in Cruzeiro, Araújo joined Sport also in a temporary deal. Returning to the Che in January 2017, he scored in a Copa del Rey 2–1 loss against Celta de Vigo on the 12th before being loaned out to SD Huesca six days later.

On 1 September 2017, Araújo terminated his contract with the Che.

Zaragoza
Immediately after terminating his contract, Araújo signed a one-year deal with Real Zaragoza.

Vasco da Gama
On 3 August 2018 Vinicius was announced for Vasco da Gama.

International career
Vinícius Araújo was called up for Brazil U20's in May 2013. The following month he was the topscorer of the 2013 Toulon Tournament, and scored Brazil's only goal in the 2013 Valais Youth Cup final against Ghana.

Club statistics

Honours

Club
Cruzeiro
Campeonato Brasileiro Série A: 2013

International
Brazil U20
Toulon Tournament: 2013
Valais Youth Cup: 2013

References

External links

1993 births
Living people
Association football forwards
Brazilian footballers
Brazil under-20 international footballers
J2 League players
Campeonato Brasileiro Série A players
La Liga players
Segunda División players
Belgian Pro League players
Cruzeiro Esporte Clube players
Sport Club do Recife players
CR Vasco da Gama players
Avaí FC players
Valencia CF players
SD Huesca footballers
Real Zaragoza players
Standard Liège players
Montedio Yamagata players
FC Machida Zelvia players
Brazilian expatriate footballers
Brazilian expatriate sportspeople in Spain
Expatriate footballers in Spain
Brazilian expatriate sportspeople in Belgium
Expatriate footballers in Belgium
Brazilian expatriate sportspeople in Japan
Expatriate footballers in Japan
Brazil youth international footballers